Leibler Yavneh College is an independent Modern Orthodox Jewish comprehensive co-educational primary and secondary day school, located in the Melbourne suburb of Elsternwick, Victoria, Australia. The school currently has over 700 students enrolled from Kindergarten to Year 12. , the principal was Shula Lazar.

History
Leibler Yavneh College was founded in 1961 as Yavneh College, and began at 81 Balaclava Road, Caulfield North with 53 students ranging from Kindergarten to Year 1. It was established with the objective of attaining high standards in Jewish and General Studies. The College saw its first Year 6 graduates in 1974 and for the next 13 years operated solely as a primary school.

In 1979 a secondary school was opened on a site in Mercer Road, and six years later Leibler Yavneh College presented its first VCE graduates. The college has regularly achieved excellent VCE results that put it within the top 10 schools in Victoria.

By 1989 the College expanded at such a rate that larger premises were required. This led to the acquisition of the present Slezak Campus in Elsternwick, which today accommodates more than 700 students from Prep to Year 12. The remaining junior and senior kindergarten students (totalling almost 100) are accommodated at the Abeles-Liberman Pre-school on Balaclava Road, Caulfield.

From its beginning it was intended to be a Zionist school, with the establishment of The State of Israel central to its identity.

In 2007  former principal Roy Steinman announced that the College will undergo a $10 million expansion at both the Early Learning Centre, as well as the main school. The project was due for completion by late 2009/early 2010. The expansions included a new auditorium, cafeteria and library. In mid-2010, the new section for the high school was opened.

Curriculum
The secondary school curriculum includes English, Halacha / Mishnah / Gemara, Hebrew, French, Mathematics, Health and Physical education, Dance, Science, History, Tanakh, IT/Multimedia and Robotics, and The Arts including Music, Artistic/Jewellery and Technology design, and Drama.

Year 12 curriculum
The College offers an extensive range of subjects available to all students participating in years 11 and 12. These include English, English Literature, Chemistry, Physics,  Biology, Psychology, Further Mathematics, Maths Methods, Specialist Mathematics, Legal Studies, Accounting, Hebrew, History, Business Management, Drama, Music, Art, Health and Physical Education, Texts and Traditions, Visual Communication and Design, Media Studies, and Studio Arts

Community service

A core principle to Judaism is Torah, Avodah and Gemilut Hasadim. These principles are intertwined in the core beliefs of the college. Therefore, a compulsory extra curricular activity for students in Years 7–10 is the commitment to community service. All students are expected to give a minimum of 20 hours per year to a range of organisations or individuals. Some take part in cross-age tutoring (working with younger children to assist teachers in class), others are involved in fundraisers. Some visit the elderly on a regular basis while others help to form a minyan at one of the homes for the care of the elderly. The activities are varied and students have an opportunity to give their own time to causes that are linked to the Jewish community in Australia and Israel, as well as the broader Australian community. As the concept of giving becomes part of their lives most students continue their community service in Years 11 and 12 and beyond, on a voluntary basis.

Victorian Certificate of Education (VCE)
Yavneh has consistently performed well over the years, as with some other Jewish schools and has been ranked amongst the highest achieving Victorian schools. For example, in 2007, thirty percent of the College's graduating students received ATAR scores of 95 or above and in 2021, sixty percent of the College's graduating students received ATAR scores of 90 or above, with one quarter also obtaining ATAR scores of 97 or above. Past alumni Racheli Rosenblum (2000), Gali Kolt (2004) and Nadav Ellinson (2007), have each attained the highest ATAR of 99.95, placing in the top 32 students in the state.

Leibler Yavneh College ranks highly amongst Victorian schools for VCE results. Recently – in 2003 (1st), 2004 (3rd), 2007 (5th), 2008 (5th), 2010 (7th), 2012 (10th), 2014 (9th) and 2021 (7th) – Yavneh placed within the top 10 schools in the state.

See also

 List of non-government schools in Victoria
 Judaism in Australia

References

External links
 Yavneh College Website

Educational institutions established in 1961
Modern Orthodox Jewish day schools
Jewish schools in Melbourne
1961 establishments in Australia
Buildings and structures in the City of Glen Eira
Elsternwick, Victoria